The 8th APAN Star Awards ceremony took place on September 29, 2022, at Korea International Exhibition Center, Western Ilsan District, Goyang, Gyeonggi Province. Hosted by Kwon Yu-ri and Jung Il-woo, it was held face-to-face for the first time in two years. The 2022 awards recognised the excellence in South Korea's television, including terrestrial, cable, OTT, and web dramas, aired from March 2021 to July 2022. Starting from this edition, another category for OTT dramas was introduced.

Winners and nominees
Winners are listed first, highlighted in boldface.

 Nominees

Performers 
 Kang Daniel 
 Yuju
 Chancellor

See also
 APAN Music Awards
 7th APAN Star Awards

References

External links
 
 2020 Winner's list

APAN
APAN Star Awards
APAN Star Awards